Jonathan Eysseric and Jürgen Zopp were the defending champions but only Zopp chose to defend his title, partnering Matija Pecotić. Pecotić and Zopp lost in the first round to Chen Ti and Jason Jung.

Wu Di and Zhang Zhizhen won the title after defeating Nicolás Barrientos and Ruben Gonzales 7–6(7–4), 6–3 in the final.

Seeds

Draw

References

 Main Draw

ATP Challenger China International - Nanchang - Doubles